Dwight Ball (born December 21, 1957) is a Canadian politician who was the 13th premier of Newfoundland and Labrador from December 14, 2015, to August 19, 2020, and an MHA. He represented the electoral district of Humber Valley in the Newfoundland and Labrador House of Assembly, and was the leader of the Liberal Party from November 17, 2013 to August 3, 2020.

On January 3, 2012, Ball began his duties as Leader of the Official Opposition and interim leader of the Liberal Party. On July 5, 2013, Ball stepped down as interim leader of the Liberal Party to run for the position permanently in the 2013 leadership election, which he won. He was sworn in on December 14, 2015.

On November 30, 2015, Ball won a 31-seat majority government in the 2015 election. The Ball government was re-elected to a minority government in 2019.

On February 17, 2020, Ball announced his pending resignation. Following a virtual convention on August 3 -- held in part due to the ongoing COVID-19 pandemic—Ball was succeeded by Andrew Furey, who assumed the premiership on August 19, 2020.

Early life and career
Dwight Ball was raised in Deer Lake, Newfoundland and Labrador, and graduated from Elwood Regional High School. He attended Memorial University when he was 17 years old. His younger brother is Deer Lake's mayor Dean Ball.

Ball was the recipient of the Bowl of Hygeia Award for his work as a community pharmacist that began with his franchising of the Deer Lake Pharmacy. Ball later bought a community pharmacy in Springdale. Ball is also the owner of several senior care homes and is involved in real estate development and venture capital investments. The towns of Deer Lake and Springdale have independently both named Ball as Employer of the Year for his contributions to supportive employment programs in the area.

Politics
Ball was the Liberal candidate in the district of Humber Valley in the 2003 provincial election, but was defeated by Progressive Conservative candidate Kathy Goudie by less than 200 votes. When Goudie resigned from the legislature, Ball ran in a by-election to succeed her on February 13, 2007. At first, it was announced that Progressive Conservative candidate Darryl Kelly had won the by-election by a margin of twelve votes; however, Ball was later declared elected by a margin of 18 votes. A judicial recount was conducted weeks later and resulted in a reduction of Ball's lead to seven votes. In a rematch in the general election on October 9, 2007, Kelly defeated Ball by 254 votes. Four years later Ball once again ran as the Liberal candidate in the 2011 election and this time narrowly defeated Kelly by 68 votes.

Leadership
At a press conference on December 15, 2011, the Liberal Party announced that Ball would serve as interim leader of the party and as the Leader of the Official Opposition, effective January 3, 2012. He succeeds Kevin Aylward, who failed to win a seat in the general election, as leader of the Liberal Party and Yvonne Jones as the Official Opposition Leader. Ball announced on the same day that he planned to run for the permanent leadership of the party at the next leadership convention, and that he would step down as interim leader 90 days before the convention to even the playing field for other candidates. In May 2012, the party announced the leadership convention would take place from November 15–17, 2013. On July 5, 2013, Ball stepped down as interim leader of the Liberal Party to run for the position permanently in the leadership election that November, which he won with 59% of the vote on the 3rd ballot. Ball served as leader for the party in the 2015 general election.

Premiership (2015–2020)
Ball was sworn in as Premier on December 14, 2015, after leading the Liberal Party to win 31 of 40 seats in the House of Assembly in the election in November.

Despite consistent Progressive Conservative leads in polling through the debate, including a 9-point lead in the final poll, released a day before the election, The Liberal Party led by Dwight Ball won re-election in the 2019 provincial election, but nonetheless fell one seat short of retaining their majority after an unexpected loss to the New Democrats in Labrador West by 5 votes.

On February 17, 2020, Premier Ball announced his resignation as Premier and Leader of the Liberal Party. On August 3, 2020, Andrew Furey was chosen to succeed Ball after winning the provincial Liberal leadership race.

Minister of Labrador and Aboriginal Affairs
Ball took over the post of Minister of Labrador and Aboriginal Affairs from PC Keith Russell after the election in 2015. This decision was somewhat controversial as none of the Aboriginal MHAs from Labrador were appointed to Ball's cabinet and Ball was neither from Labrador or an Aboriginal, however, the move was supported by NunatuKavut president and former Labrador MP Todd Russell.

Inquiries
In December 2015, it was announced that public inquiries into the deaths of Don Dunphy (a man from Mitchells Brook who was shot dead by a police officer after posting content on Twitter that was deemed a "security threat".) and Burton Winters (a teenager from Makkovik who got lost by himself outside of his community and died of hypothermia while a search helicopter did not arrive until 52 hours later.) would take place. The Dunphy inquiry took place during Ball's term; however the Winters inquiry did not.

In 2017, Premier Ball called a public inquiry into the Muskrat Falls project which took place between 2018 and 2020. In the inquiry report Commissioner Richard LeBlanc concluded the government failed its duty to residents by predetermining that the megaproject would proceed no matter what. In his report, LeBlanc concluded that the business case, which assumed the Muskrat Falls project was the lowest-cost power option, was “questionable.” LeBlanc stated that the project’s economics were not sufficiently tested and that Nalcor failed to consider all potentially viable power options. LeBlanc stated that Nalcor concealed information that could have undermined the business case for the project from the public and government.

2016-17 budget
The provincial government unveiled its budget in April 2016 which implemented austerity measures. Ball and Minister of Finance Cathy Bennett do not expect the province to see another surplus until 2022.

Anti-austerity protests took place across the province in areas like St. John's, Corner Brook, Grand Falls-Windsor and Happy Valley-Goose Bay.

Natural resources

Ed Martin scandal

In early 2016, Nalcor Energy CEO Ed Martin left the company. Ball and Martin each claim that Martin left under conflicting circumstances.

Lower Churchill Project

The cost of the Lower Churchill Project has doubled since it started development nearly a decade before Ball took office. The province's financial situation was different when the project started development, the price of oil was high (Newfoundland and Labrador is an oil-producing province), however, the price of oil and the value of the Canadian dollar has gone down since. Ball has blamed the governments of Danny Williams and Kathy Dunderdale for the number of problems that the project has caused.

In 2016, researchers from Harvard University found that methylmercury levels in fish would rise as a result of the project. After protests led by Indigenous groups in Central Labrador in 2016, an Agreement was reached by Labrador’s three Indigenous groups (Nunatsiavut Government, Innu Nation and the NunatuKavut Community Council) and the Government of Newfoundland and Labrador outlining the establishment of an independent committee to make recommendations on mitigating potential impacts of methylmercury on human health from the Lower Churchill Project at Muskrat Falls, Labrador. In 2018, the committee recommended — among other things — wetland capping to stem the release of methylmercury.

During the Muskrat Falls inquiry in 2019, it was revealed the provincial government wouldn’t be completing wetland capping at the Muskrat Falls reservoir as previously planned. The $30 million designated for the capping was split up and offered to all three Indigenous governments with the Innu Nation and NunatuKavut accepting. Nalcor had applied for a permit in July 2018 to carry out the approximately 13 hectares of wetland capping — essentially pouring sand and stone over a small area of wetland near the reservoir — but the permit was never approved by the Department of Municipal Affairs and Environment. Ball later said wetland capping would have only decreased methylmercury levels by two per cent.

Popularity
During the 2015 election campaign Ball's Liberals usually saw public approval ratings well over 50%. His party earned 57.2% of the votes in the election. In February 2016, a poll showed that 60% of respondents approved of Ball's work as premier.

The 2016-17 budget had a huge impact on Ball's public approval. A poll from MQO Research in April 2016 showed a near tie in support for all 3 parties, a huge difference from a few months earlier when Ball's liberals had far more support than the other 2 parties. Combined with the scandal involving Ed Martin, Ball's public support has dropped at a fast rate since the election. A poll in May 2016 showed that Ball was the least popular head of government in the country with a 17% approval rating. The second lowest score was Ontario's Kathleen Wynne with 24%.

An online petition calling for Ball's resignation went viral in June 2016, but Ball has stated that he will not resign and he also stated that the province would not go bankrupt.

On June 16, 2018, delegates at the Liberal Party Annual General Meeting vote to endorse the leadership of Ball with 79% voting against the party holding a leadership convention.

Resignation
On February 17, 2020, Ball announced his pending resignation as leader of the Liberal Party and Premier amidst accusations of cronyism. The decision came after CBC News linked Ball to awarding the sole-source contract for the Crown corporation Nalcor Energy to Gordon McIntosh, former Deputy of Natural Resources Minister Siobhan Coady and the designer of Newfoundland and Labrador's off-shore energy plan.

The Liberal Party initially planned to elect a new leader in May 2020; however, the election was delayed by the COVID-19 pandemic. In the 2020 Liberal Party of Newfoundland and Labrador leadership election, surgeon Andrew Furey was chosen as Ball's successor. Furey was sworn-in on August 19, 2020. On September 7, 2020 Ball resigned as MHA for Humber-Gros Morne.

Electoral record

|-Dwight Ball

|-

|-

|}

|-

|-

|-

|}

|-

|-

|-

|}

|-

|-

|-

|}

|-

|-

|}

References

External links
 Dwight Ball 

1957 births
Canadian pharmacists
Liberal Party of Newfoundland and Labrador MHAs
Living people
Premiers of Newfoundland and Labrador
Members of the Executive Council of Newfoundland and Labrador
People from Deer Lake, Newfoundland and Labrador
21st-century Canadian politicians